Dahli is a taluka of Tharparkar District in Sindh, Pakistan. Khokhropar railway station, also known as Zero Point railway station, is located in the border town of Khokhrapar of this taluka. The Thar Express (international passenger train) connects Karachi to Jodhpur through this terminus.

See also 
Mithi
Islamkot
Sant Nenuram Ashram
Nagarparkar
Diplo
Chachro
Kaloi

References

Tharparkar District